Iresine rhizomatosa is a species of plant in the family Amaranthaceae. It is native to the Americas. In the United States, it has a spotty distribution, being concentrated in the Ozark and Ouachita Mountains and along the coast. It is often found in thin woods over sandy alluvial soil, often along rivers or dunes. 
It is a rhizomatous perennial that produces white flowers in the fall. It is dioecious, with male and female flowers on separate individuals.

References

rhizomatosa
Flora of North America
Flora of South America
Dioecious plants